Obra Assembly constituency is an assembly constituency in Aurangabad district in the Indian state of Bihar. It comes under Karakat Lok Sabha constituency. Obra Vidhan Sabha is constituted of two blocks of Aurangabad district viz. Daudnagar and Obra.
As per the estimates of the 2011 census, out of a total 432861 population, 84.49% is rural and 15.51% is urban population. The
Scheduled castes (SC) and Scheduled tribes (ST) ratio is 22.05 and 0.04, respectively out of total population. As per the voter list of 2019,
there are 305747 electorates and 336 polling stations in this constituency. Voter turnout was 48.8% in 2019 Lok Sabha elections and 55.06% in 2020 Bihar assembly election.

Members of Legislative Assembly

Assembly Elections 2020

References

External links
 

Assembly constituencies of Bihar
Politics of Aurangabad district, Bihar